Hymenelia grossa is a species of saxicolous (rock-dwelling), crustose lichen in the family Hymeneliaceae. Found in Korea, it was formally described as a new species in 2014 by lichenologists André Aptroot and Kwang-Hee Moon. It does not have any positive reaction to common chemical spot tests; thin layer chromatographic analysis suggests the presence of the lichen product known as confluentic acid. In the area of its type locality, it is one of the most common saxicolous lichen species. It often grows alongside members of the crustose lichen genus Circinaria.

References

Baeomycetales
Lichen species
Lichens described in 2014
Taxa named by André Aptroot
Lichens of Eastern Asia